Calm Before the Storm is the sixth studio album by the Australian musician, Jon English, and his first under the Mercury Records label. The album was released in Australia in April 1980 and peaked at number 17 on the Kent Music Report in March 1983.

Two singles were released from the album: "Hot Town" which peaked at No. 11 on the Kent Music chart, and "Carmilla", which peaked at No. 27.

The international version had a slightly altered track-listing and included the track "Hold Back the Night" which was released as a single in 1981.

Track listing
Vinyl/ Cassette (6357 067)
Side One
 "Survivor" (English) - 3:31
 "Save Me" (Garry Paige, Mark Punch) - 3:15
 "Carmilla" (English) - 3:47
 "Down in Frisco" (Mike Wade) - 3:12
 "Hot Town" (Graeme Connors, Wade) - 3:43

Side Two
 "Little By Little" (Tony Naylor) - 4:22
 "Feel Like Dancing" (Wade, Naylor) - 3:22
 "Sad News" (Wade) - 3:34
 "Split" (Naylor) - 3:41
 "Hope it Turns Out Right" (Connors, Wade) - 4:23

Charts

Certifications

References

External links

1980 albums
Jon English albums
Mercury Records albums